This is a list of members of the Australian House of Representatives of the 43rd Parliament of Australia (2010–2013), as elected at the 2010 federal election.

Note: There were no separate caucuses for the LNP or the CLP; members of these parties caucus with either the Liberal or National parties.
 These members caucused with the Liberal Party.
 These members caucused with the National Party. 
 The independent MP for Kennedy, Bob Katter, formed Katter's Australian Party on 3 June 2011.
 The LNP MP for Fisher, Peter Slipper, accepted Labor's nomination for the position of Speaker on 24 November 2011 and resigned from the Liberal National Party.
 The Labor MP for Dobell, Craig Thomson, was suspended from the party on 28 April 2012 and the Labor party has indicated he is unlikely to rejoin under any circumstances.
 Tony Crook, the MP for O'Connor and sole member of the Nationals WA in the parliament, initially sat on the crossbenches before joining the National party room on 2 May 2012.

References

Members of Australian parliaments by term
21st-century Australian politicians
2010s politics-related lists